The New Jersey Office of the Public Defender is an agency that is a part of the government of the state of New Jersey, in the United States. The agency provides legal aid to "low income people charged with major crimes."

The agency was first established in 1967. In 1974, the agency was incorporated into New Jersey Department of the Public Advocate.

See also

Public defender

References

External links
 New Jersey Office of the Public Defender website

Legal aid in the United States
Criminal defense organizations
Public defense institutions